Krzysztof Skiba (born 7 July 1964 in Gdańsk) is a Polish musician, singer-songwriter, satirist, essayist and actor. He is best known as the vocalist of the rock band, Big Cyc.

In 1983, he cofounded the anarchy organization Ruch Społeczeństwa Alternatywnego (Movement of Alternative Society), and performed in student theatre Pstrąg and in many school cabarets, also co-creating street happenings named “The Orange Alternative”. In 1988, Skiba joined Jacek Jędrzejak (guitar), Jarosław Lis (drums), and Roman Lechowicz (guitar) in Big Cyc, the previous vocalist, Robert Rejewski, having left. Skiba was the only one who did not choose a pseudonym for his name. For several years, Skiba has been writing opinion pieces for Wprost, a Polish magazine, and in 2005, published a book: Skibą w mur.

He is known for his controversial behaviour. In May 1999, Skiba was charged with indecent exposure and fined the equivalent of $308 for mooning the Polish prime minister Jerzy Buzek during a festival in February 1999.

References
   
 Krzysztof Skiba at filmpolski.pl
 Krzysztof Skiba at filmweb.pl

External links
  Blog of Krzysztof Skiba

1964 births
Living people
20th-century Polish male singers
21st-century Polish male singers
21st-century Polish singers
University of Łódź alumni
Musicians from Gdańsk